David Schlosberg (born November 16, 1963) is an American political theorist who is currently a Professor of Environmental Politics in the Department of Government and International Relations the University of Sydney.

Career
Schlosberg earned his bachelor of arts in politics and psychology, graduating from the University of California at Santa Cruz in 1985. He then read for a master of science in political science at the University of Oregon (UO), graduating in 1991, and then a doctorate in political science, also at the UO. He completed this degree in 1996. From 1992 to 1996, he worked as an instructor at the UO. In 1996, he started a job at the Department of Politics and International Affairs, Northern Arizona University (NAU); first as assistant professor, then Associate Professor and Full Professor. He was an affiliate faculty member at the Center for Sustainable Environments at NAU which he remained until 2010, and, in 2005, he became the chair of the Department of Politics and International Relations. In 2008, he stopped being chair, and became the director of the university's Environmental Studies Program, which he remained until 2010. Schlosberg left NAU in 2011, when he became Professor of Environmental Politics in the Department of Government and International Relations at the University of Sydney, Australia, and the co-director of the Sydney Environment Institute.

Selected publications

Monographs
Schlosberg, David, John Dryzek and Richard Norgaard (2013). Climate-Challenged Society. Oxford: Oxford University Press.
Schlosberg, David (2007) Defining Environmental Justice: Theories, Movements, and Nature. Oxford: Oxford University Press.
Schlosberg, David, John Dryzek, David Downes, and Christian Hunold (2003). Green States and Social Movements: Environmentalism in the United States, Britain, Germany, and Norway. Oxford: Oxford University Press.
Schlosberg, David (1999). Environmental Justice and the New Pluralism: The Challenge of Difference for Environmentalism. Oxford: Oxford University Press.

Edited collections
Schlosberg, David, Teena Gabrielson, Cheryl Hall, and John Meyer, eds., (2015). The Oxford Handbook of Environmental Political Theory. Oxford: Oxford University Press.
Schlosberg, David and Marcel Wissenburg, eds., (2014). Political Animals and Animal Politics. Basingstoke, United Kingdom: Palgrave Macmillan.
Schlosberg, David, John Dryzek and Richard Norgaard, eds., (2011). The Oxford Handbook of Climate Change and Society. Oxford: Oxford University Press.
Schlosberg, David and  Elizabeth Bomberg (2008). Environmentalism in the United States: Changing Patterns of Action and Advocacy. London: Routledge.
Schlosberg, David and John Dryzek (2005). Debating the Earth: The Environmental Politics Reader. Second Edition. Oxford: Oxford University Press.

References

External links
Official site

1963 births
Living people
American political philosophers
Green thinkers
University of California, Santa Cruz alumni
Northern Arizona University faculty
Academic staff of the University of Sydney
Environmental social scientists